Tobias Wiesner (born 31 July 1990) is a German footballer who plays as a centre-forward for SC Ettmannsdorf.

Career
Wiesner made his professional debut for Jahn Regensburg in the 3. Liga on 21 March 2009, coming on as a substitute in the 90+1st minute for Patrick Würll in the 2–1 home win against SV Sandhausen.

References

External links
 Profile at DFB.de
 Profile at kicker.de
 Jahn Regensburg II statistics at BFV.de
 DJK Ammerthal statistics at BFV.de
 SV Donaustauf statistics at BFV.de
 SC Ettmannsdorf 2017–18 statistics at BFV.de
 SC Ettmannsdorf 2018–19 statistic at BFV.de

1990 births
Living people
German footballers
Association football forwards
SSV Jahn Regensburg players
FC Amberg players
3. Liga players
Regionalliga players
SSV Jahn Regensburg II players